Michael Köhlmeier (born 15 October 1949 in Hard, Austria) is a contemporary Austrian writer and musician.

He studied Politics and German (1970–1978) at the University of Marburg, Germany, and Mathematics and Philosophy at the universities in Giessen and Frankfurt, Germany.  Recent acclaim hailed from his radio broadcasts of casually told antique myths (Telemachus and Calypso) and biblical stories (Moses), which were later issued as CDs and in book form.

Together with Reinhold Bilgeri he has composed cabaret programs and song lyrics, which both artists presented in public as the Duo Bilgeri & Köhlmeier. With the group Schellinski he has been writing song texts in Vorarlberg dialect since 2004.

In 1981 he married the writer Monika Helfer. Their daughter Paula Köhlmeier died in an accident in 2003, at the age of 21, and he dedicated his book Idylle mit ertrinkendem Hund (Idyll With Drowning Dog) as a memorial to her and his surviving family.

Other books include Abendland (Occident, Carl Hanser Verlag, August 2007), about the memoirs of a mathematics professor, telling the history of two families over the past 95 years. It has met with critical acclaim.

Michael Köhlmeier lives as a free-lance writer in Hohenems, Vorarlberg. In 1997 he received the Grimmelshausen Prize.

Awards 
 Johann Peter Hebel Prize (1988)
 Manès Sperber Prize for Literature (1994) 
 Golden Badge of Honour for Meritorious Service of Vienna (2007)
 Prize Acknowledging Literary Achievements (2008)

References 

1949 births
Living people
Austrian male writers
Anton Wildgans Prize winners